Taha Zaydan Alabed is a Palestinian poet, writer and voice actor.

Bibliography 
Al Kifayat Al Sawtiya (2014)

Filmography

Television 
 Bayn Amwaj El Zaman (writer)
 Shu'ara Rathaw Anfusahom (writer)
 Wa Fi Anfusikum Afala Tufakiroun (writer)
 Atraf El Haywanat Fi El Alam (writer)
 Khoyout El Adala (writer)

Dubbing roles 
 Deadly 60
 Mokhtarnameh - Za'da
 Prophet Joseph - Kidamen
 Ratatouille - Skinner (Classical Arabic version)
 Treasure Planet - John Silver (Classical Arabic version)
 Up - Dug (Classical Arabic version)

References

External links

Palestinian male poets
Male voice actors
Male actors from Beirut
Year of birth missing (living people)
Living people
21st-century Palestinian poets
Palestinian writers
21st-century male writers
Writers from Beirut